Ensio Nieminen (30 March 1930 – 27 September 2008) was a Finnish cyclist. He competed in the men's tandem event at the 1952 Summer Olympics.

References

External links
 

1930 births
2008 deaths
Finnish male cyclists
Olympic cyclists of Finland
Cyclists at the 1952 Summer Olympics
Place of birth missing